Smim Htaw (died 27 March 1553) was a pretender to the Hanthawaddy throne, and the last king in the line of the Hanthawaddy dynasty. He ruled a small region around Pegu as king from 1550 to 1552.

An ex-Buddhist monk, and a son of King Binnya Ran II by a minor queen, Htaw first raised a rebellion in 1549 during the reign of King Tabinshwehti of Toungoo, who had conquered the Mon-speaking kingdom ten years earlier. Htaw was on the run in the delta chased after by Gen. Bayinnaung of Toungoo when Tabinshwehti was assassinated by one of his close advisers, Smim Sawhtut, on 30 April 1550. Sawhtut proclaimed himself king. Htaw raised an army and defeated Sawhtut near Pegu (Bago) in August 1550. Though proclaimed himself king at once, Htaw controlled just the region around Pegu.

His rule at Pegu lasted about a year and a half as Bayinnaung, who was heir apparent under Tabinshwehti, came to attack Pegu in March 1552. North of the city, Toungoo and Peguan forces met. In desperation, Htaw challenged and fought Bayinnaung in single combat, both on their war elephants. Bayinnaung was victorious, charging his foe and driving him off after breaking the tusk of Htaw's elephant. Bayinnaung reportedly "paid Htaw no more heed than a lion does to jackals." Pegu was taken. Htaw was on the run for the next 12 months until he was captured in March 1553. He was brought to Pegu and executed on 27 March (13th waxing of Tagu 935 ME).

References

Bibliography
 
 
 
 

Hanthawaddy dynasty
1553 deaths
Year of birth unknown
16th-century Burmese monarchs